Cristhian Machado Pinto (born 20 June 1990) is a Bolivian footballer who plays as a midfielder.

Professional career

Over the first 10 years of his career, Machado made 145 appearances and 120 starts for C.D. Jorge Wilstermann in the Bolivian Primera División. During his time with the club he helped them to two first-division titles in 2016 and 2018. On July 23, 2018, The New England Revolution of Major League Soccer acquired Machado from Wilstermann via the Major League Soccer secondary transfer window. Revolution coach Brad Friedel had originally tried to sign Machado in December 2017 but was unable to complete the deal.

Though he'd played the entirety of his pre-Revolution career with Wilstermann, he had played in the United States prior to joining the Revolution when he spent six months with the Fort Lauderdale Strikers in the North American Soccer League. Machado would be re-joining Marcelo Neveleff, then a Revolution assistant coach, who had spent time with Wilstermann in the 2011-12 season. At the time of his signing, Machado had 2 starts in World Cup Qualifying matches with the Bolivia national team. Machado called his move to MLS a "Dream come true" and Revolution GM Mike Burns praised Cristhian's versatility:

Machado made his first appearance for the Revolution on August 4, 2018. Appearing in the 87th minute as a substitute for Diego Fagundez in a 3-3 draw with Orlando City SC.

Machado made his first start for the Revolution on August 25, 2018 in a 1-0 away loss to the Philadelphia Union.

The Revolution declined Machado's contract option on November 5, 2018.

References

External links
 
 

1990 births
Living people
Association football midfielders
Bolivian footballers
Fort Lauderdale Strikers players
New England Revolution players
C.D. Jorge Wilstermann players
Sport Boys Warnes players
Club Bolívar players
Major League Soccer players
Bolivian Primera División players
Bolivian expatriate footballers
Expatriate soccer players in the United States
Bolivia international footballers
Sportspeople from Cochabamba
Bolivian expatriate sportspeople in the United States